Bắc Bình is a rural district of Bình Thuận province in the Southeast region of Vietnam. As of 2003 the district had a population of 108,224. The district covers an area of 1,079 km2. The district capital lies at Chợ Lầu.

References

Districts of Bình Thuận province